Bryan University (BU) is a private for-profit university based in Tempe, Arizona. It has additional campuses in Los Angeles, Sacramento, Toronto, and Tempe.

History 
Bryan College was established in 1940 by Mildred T. Bryan. Bryan welcomed her first three students into her living room, which served as the initial classroom for the institution, originally named Bryan Stenotype School.

In 2005, under the parent company Alta Education, LLC, Bryan extended its reach by opening a campus in Sacramento, CA. With this new campus, Bryan College introduced additional degree programs.

Accreditation 
Bryan University is licensed by the Arizona State Board for Private Postsecondary Education and is accredited by the Accrediting Commission of Career Schools and Colleges (ACCSC) to award diplomas, academic associate degrees, occupational associate degrees, bachelor's degrees, post-graduation certificates, and master's degrees.

References

External links
 Official website

1940 establishments in Arizona
Educational institutions established in 1940
Private universities and colleges in Arizona
Distance education institutions based in the United States